Lake Rychy , Richi, or Richu is a freshwater lake shared by the Braslaw District of Vitebsk Region, Belarus, and Augšdaugava Municipality, Latvia.

The lake is second-deepest in Belarus and fourth-deepest in Latvia.

References

Rychy
Rychy
Belarus–Latvia border
Braslaw District
Augšdaugava Municipality
Selonia